Lawrence Whiteside "Laurie" Williams (born 16 November 1948) was a Scottish footballer who played for Dumbarton and Morton. He also had brief loan spells with Motherwell and Dundee.

References

1948 births
Living people
Association football goalkeepers
Scottish footballers
Dumbarton F.C. players
Motherwell F.C. players
Dundee F.C. players
Greenock Morton F.C. players
Scottish Football League players